Sinocnemis is a genus of flatwings in the damselfly order Odonata. There are at least three described species in Sinocnemis.

As a result of molecular phylogenetic studies by Dijkstra et al. in 2013, the genus Sinocnemis is considered "incertae sedis", without an assigned family but within the superfamily Calopterygoidea.

Species
These three species belong to the genus Sinocnemis:
 Sinocnemis dumonti Wilson & Zhou, 2000
 Sinocnemis henanese Wang, 2003
 Sinocnemis yangbingi Wilson & Zhou, 2000

References

Calopterygoidea